W35DQ-D is a low-powered TV station serving Flint, Michigan and licensed to Midland, Michigan.  It broadcasts on digital channel 35 and virtual channel 24. It is owned by DTV America Corp. Its transmitter is located on Farrand Road northwest of Clio, Michigan.  Even though the station is licensed to Midland, the signal does not reach there.

References

W35DQ-D
Mass media in Flint, Michigan